Graham Shiel (born 13 August 1970 in Galashiels, Scotland ) is the skills coach of the Scotland rugby 7's team. He is now retired from playing rugby, having made 18 appearances for the Scotland national rugby union team and once for the national sevens team.

Rugby union Career

Amateur career

He played with Melrose RFC from 1988 for fifteen years winning five National Championship and five Border League titles with them.

He played for the Australian amateur club Manly in 1992.

He later joined Stewart's Melville.

Professional career

He played for Border Reivers - and then Edinburgh Rugby where he was captain from 2000 to 2002.

International career

Shiel's international debut was against Ireland at Murrayfield in October 1991. His last international appearance was against New Zealand at Auckland in July 2000.

He represented Scotland at the Hong Kong Sevens in 1996.

Shiel was also capped by the Barbarians.

Coaching career

He first took on a coaching role while still a player at Stewart's Melville.

In 2006 he became academy manager at Edinburgh Rugby.

In October 2010 he was named as Scotland’s seven’s coach. In 2012 was moved to sevens skills coach.

Outside of rugby

He is a qualified stonemason.

References

External links
 profile at Scottish Rugby

1970 births
Living people
Barbarian F.C. players
Border Reivers players
Edinburgh Rugby players
Male rugby sevens players
Melrose RFC players
Rugby union centres
Rugby union players from Galashiels
Scotland international rugby sevens players
Scotland international rugby union players
Scottish rugby union players
Stewart's Melville RFC players